Arkaul (Arqawıl) is a rural locality (a village) in Staronadezhdinsky Selsoviet, Blagoveshchensky District, Bashkortostan, Russia. The population was 93 as of 2010. There are 2 streets.

Geography 
Arkaul is located 44 km northeast of Blagoveshchensk (the district's administrative centre) by road. Bykovo is the nearest rural locality.

References 

Rural localities in Blagoveshchensky District